Leucostoma gravipes is a North American species of fly in the family Tachinidae.

Distribution
Mexico.

References

Phasiinae
Diptera of North America
Insects described in 1890
Taxa named by Frederik Maurits van der Wulp